Romagnano Sesia railway station is the train station serving the comune of Romagnano Sesia, in the Piedmont region, northwestern Italy. It is the junction of the Novara–Varallo and Santhià–Arona (suspended from 17 June 2012).

The station is currently managed by Rete Ferroviaria Italiana (RFI). However, the passenger building is managed by the comune. The station is served only by historic trains, in the service of tourism, in planned dates. Regular passenger services were  suspended from 15 September 2014, by decision of the Piedmont Region. Train services are operated by Fondazione FS and Trenitalia. Each of these companies is a subsidiary of Ferrovie dello Stato (FS), Italy's state-owned rail company.

History
The station was opened on 22 February 1883, upon the inauguration the first part of the Novara–Varallo railway, from Vignale to Romagnano Sesia.

Features
Six tracks, five of which are equipped with platforms, pass through the station.

Train services
The station is served by the following services:

Historic train (Treno storico) Novara - Varallo Sesia

See also

 History of rail transport in Italy
 List of railway stations in Piedmont
 Rail transport in Italy
 Railway stations in Italy

References

External links

Romagnano Sesia
Railway stations in Piedmont
Railway stations opened in 1883